Ryszard Białowąs (14 July 1947 – 23 February 2004) was a Polish basketball player. He competed in the men's tournament at the 1972 Summer Olympics.

References

1947 births
2004 deaths
Polish men's basketball players
Olympic basketball players of Poland
Basketball players at the 1972 Summer Olympics
People from Sulechów
Sportspeople from Lubusz Voivodeship